Nanna Prayashchittha (Kannada: ನನ್ನ ಪ್ರಾಯಶ್ಚಿತ್ತ) is a 1978 Indian Kannada film, directed by Ugranarasimha and produced by Jaswanth Kumar. The film stars Vishnuvardhan, Lokesh, Manjula and Rehana Sulthan in lead roles. The film had musical score by Sonik Omi.

Cast

Vishnuvardhan
Lokesh
Manjula
Rehana Sulthan
Asha Sachdev
Rajesh in guest appearance
K. S. Ashwath in guest appearance
Rakesh Pande in guest appearance
Jayalakshmi in guest appearance
Dinesh
Sampath
Purushottham
Paintal
Shakti Prasad
Rajanand
Karan Diwan
Raja Murad

References

1978 films
1970s Kannada-language films